Nilmaizar (also written Nil Maizar; born 2 January 1970) is a current Indonesian head coach. He holds a Bachelor of Economics degree from Ekasakti University.

Playing career 
He is a former Indonesia national football team player and defender who had trained with Sparta Prague in 1990.

Coaching career 
Nil Maizar was the head coach of Semen Padang's youth team and the assistant coach of Semen Padang for five years before appointed as the head coach in 2010.

As a manager, his quality has been proven to improve the achievement of Semen Padang. He has different touch with the players and more like as motivator. He transmuted exiles, ageing, and ordinary players be a powerful squad in one team and led the club to reach fourth position in 2010-11 Indonesia Super League, although performing as a promotion team. He led Semen Padang to gain their first title in 2011–12 Indonesian Premier League.

Following his success with the club, The Football Association of Indonesia decided to employ Nil Maizar as a senior coach for the Indonesia national football team. He was sacked in March 2013.

On 25 May 2014, he was appointed as head coach by Putra Samarinda F.C. replacing Mundari Karya. He was planned to coach Putra Samarinda for the 2015 Indonesia Super League but after the club changed ownership and name, he was replaced with Indra Sjafri on 17 December 2014.

He was signed by Semen Padang on 25 January 2015, to replace Jafri Sastra as their head coach.

On 4 July 2018, he was appointed as head coach by PS TIRA, replacing Rudy Eka Priyambada.

Honours

Player
Semen Padang
Winner
 Piala Galatama: 1992

Manager 
Semen Padang
Winner
 Indonesian Premier League: 2011–12

International matches

References 

Indonesian footballers
1970 births
Living people
Minangkabau people
Indonesia international footballers
Indonesian expatriate footballers
Expatriate footballers in Czechoslovakia
AC Sparta Prague players
Semen Padang F.C. players
Association football defenders
Indonesia national football team managers
Indonesian football managers
Sportspeople from West Sumatra